This is a list of United Nations Security Council Resolutions 301 to 400 adopted between 20 October 1971 and 7 December 1976.

See also 
 Lists of United Nations Security Council resolutions
 List of United Nations Security Council Resolutions 201 to 300
 List of United Nations Security Council Resolutions 401 to 500

0301